Spring Creek is a  tributary of the Susquehanna River in Dauphin County, Pennsylvania, in the United States.

Spring Creek rises in Lower Paxton Township, flowing through adjacent areas such as Paxtang, Oakleigh, Progress, Lawnton, and Colonial Park. The stream flows in a westerly direction, eventually joining the Susquehanna River in southern Harrisburg. The tributary Slotznick Run enters Spring Creek at Progress.

Spring Creek parallels the 2-mile stretch of the Cameron Parkway section of the Capital Area Greenbelt in South Harrisburg. Spring Creek joins the Susquehanna at Harrisburg, just near the confluence of the Paxton Creek. The historical Rutherford Springhouse was built over a Paxtang portion of the creek in the 1740s to protect the water from poisoning by the Native Susquehannock Indians. Notably, Paxtang Park was located along the creek's banks.

Tributaries
Parkway Creek
Slotznick Run

See also
List of rivers of Pennsylvania

References

 Harrisburg Watersheds

External links
U.S. Geological Survey: PA stream gaging stations

Geography of Harrisburg, Pennsylvania
Tributaries of the Susquehanna River
Rivers of Pennsylvania
Rivers of Dauphin County, Pennsylvania